Karl Elsener (13 August 1934 in Bülach – 27 July 2010) was a Swiss football goalkeeper, who played for FC Aarau, Grasshopper Club Zürich and Lausanne Sports during his club career. He earned 34 caps for the Switzerland national football team from 1958 to 1966, and participated in the 1962 FIFA World Cup and the 1966 FIFA World Cup.

References 

1934 births
Association football goalkeepers
Swiss men's footballers
Switzerland international footballers
1962 FIFA World Cup players
1966 FIFA World Cup players
FC Aarau players
Grasshopper Club Zürich players
FC Lausanne-Sport players
2010 deaths
People from Bülach
Sportspeople from the canton of Zürich